Creative4D is a Serbian video production company specializing in the production of music videos. The Director of Creative4D is Vedad Jasarevic, proclaimed music video director in the Balkans. Several of their music videos were produced in cooperation with Visual Infinity.

Music Videos Produced 
Ne placi gade by Ada Grahovic
Kisa je padala Ami G and Natalie Thanou
Mala garava by Bane Nedovic
Samo reci by Bane Nedovic
To mi se sviđa by Beat Street and Viktor Savić
Da me nije by Bojan Lukić Lukša
Niko kao ti by Danijela Vranić and Aca Lukas
Nemoj da me zalite by Danijela Vranić
Ti mi nisi siguran by Danijela Vranić
Tako ide by Darko Radovanović
Kosa do ramena by Dženan Lončarević
Putujemo snovima by Erato and Jacques Houdek
Šta ti mogu (Gad) by Funky G
Mastilo by Goca Trzan
Voleo si skota by Goca Trzan
Ne idi by Husa Beat Street
Ne dolaziš u obzir by Indira Radić
Pije mi se, pije by Indira Radić
Moje je ime sreca by Ivana Selakov
Otplovimo by Ivana Selakov
Uradi mi to by Ivana Selakov
Okeani by Jelena Tomašević
Devojka za udaju by Katarina "Kaća" Sotirović
Nisam znao da te volim by Kića Čoković and Wanted Band
Farsa by Ksenija Pajčin
Nino by Ksenija Pajčin
Pizza by Ksenija Pajčin
Zarobljena by Goca Tržan 
Vestica by Ksenija Pajčin
Kako je, tako je by Lexington Band
Da me malo hoce by Lexington Band & Bane Opacic
Donesi by Lexington Band
Pijane usne by Lexington Bend
Uvredi me by Leksington
Ako te zivot slomi by Lidija Milosevic & Dejan Matic
Da li si prestala da volis me by Marko Djurovski
Trebas mi by Marko Djurovski & Baki B3
Još sam ona stara by Marina Tadić
Ljubi, ljubi by Marina Tadić
Ja mogu sve by Maja Markovic
Luda za tobom by Maja Markovic
Nije andjeo by Milan Radjen
Face by Milan Stanković
Sasvim sigurna by Nataša Barišić
Da se nadjemo na pola puta by Neda Ukraden
Srećo moja by Neda Ukraden
Uzmi boje by Neverne bebe
Za tvoje oči by Neverne Bebe & Vanna
Kao pas by Nenad Manojlović
Moja curice by Nikola Rokvic
Ljubi mi se by Romana Panic
Afrika by Sandra Prodanović Afrika
Do jaja by Trik FX
Belo odelo by Tropico Band
Bojim se by Tropico Band
Mislicu na tebe by Tropico Band
Otisak by Tropico Band
Ti ne znas by Tropiko Band
Zar ti by Tropico Band
Ničija by Vanja Toxic
Nije za te by Željko Samardžić
 Mesec u vodi  by Željko Samardžić
Veruj bratu by Tropico Band feat. Dzenan Loncarevic
Ne dam na tebe by Trio Pasage
Praštam by Neverne Bebe
Sve moje zore by Tropico bend
Rekvijem by Neverne Bebe
Luta mi se by Scandal Band feat. Suzana Dinić
Cimerke by Fantastic Band
Prišla by Lexington band
Neka mi je šta mi je by Ivana Bojanović
Potraži me by Leksington Band
Taksi by Fantastic Band
Nikom ne dam by Beso De Loco Band
Big by Flamingosi i Nevena Božović
Generale by Severina Vučković i Učiteljice
Cura sa Balakana by Trik fx
Tri čaše by Milica Todorović
Mogu ja bez ljubavi by Sha feat. Cvija
Buka i galama by Petra Kovačević
Nije, Nije To Mia Borisavljević
Pakleni put Zvonko Pantović Čipi i Osvajači
Ako se u pesmi pronađeš Georg Smiljić
Falim ti ja by Azur Dervisagic
Moja vilo by Dragan Perović
Gluve usne by Goca Tržan
Alkohola Litar by Elitni odredi i Nikolija ft. DJ Mladja
La fiesta by Sanja Dimitrijević
Rakija by Mile Kitić
Merak by Bane Nedović
Daleko si by Aca Lukas i Ivana Selakov
Dobro da nije vece zlo by Lexington Band
Da Te Sretnem By Treći Svet
Bumerang By  Mia Borisavljević feat DJ Mlađa and MC Sha
Maksimalni intervalni trening by  Mit - Fit
Krsim, lomim by Nemanja Staletovic
Kavez by Marina Viskovic (in cooperation with AmiG production)
Buduci moj by Minja Samardzic

External links 
Official Website
Official YouTube Channel

This production company is abbreviated C4D

Serbian music video directors